Marian Matłoka (3 November 1918 in Nowy Karmin – 9 November 1986 in Wałcz) was a Polish sprint canoeist who competed in the late 1940s. At the 1948 Summer Olympics in London, he finished tenth in the K-2 10000 m event while being eliminated in the heats of the K-2 1000 m event.

References
 Sports-reference.com profile

1918 births
1986 deaths
Canoeists at the 1948 Summer Olympics
Olympic canoeists of Poland
Polish male canoeists
People from Pleszew County
Sportspeople from Greater Poland Voivodeship